Thomas Coen  (1766–1847) was an Irish prelate who served as Bishop of Clonfert.

He was born in Fohenagh. Coen was ordained priest on 30 June 1795. Coen was appointed titular bishop of Milevum on 26 January 1816; and Diocesan Bishop of Clonfert on 8 October 1831. He died on 25 April 1847.

References

Roman Catholic bishops of Clonfert
19th-century Roman Catholic bishops in Ireland
1766 births
1847 deaths
People from County Galway